Zman is Hebrew for "time", and may refer to:

 A time of day with applications in Jewish law
 A semester in a Yeshiva
 The blessing of Shehechiyanu

The plural form zmanim may also refer to:
 The third book in Maimonides' Mishneh Torah
 A newspaper run by the Progressive Party in Israel

See also:
 Žman, a village in Croatia
 Z-man (disambiguation)
 Zaman (disambiguation)